Plzeň-North District is a district in the Plzeň Region of the Czech Republic. Its capital is the city of Plzeň. The most populated town of the district is Nýřany.

Administrative division
Plzeň-North District is divided into two administrative districts of municipalities with extended competence: Kralovice and Nýřany.

List of municipalities
Towns are marked in bold:

Bdeněves -
Bezvěrov -
Bílov -
Blatnice -
Blažim -
Bohy -
Brodeslavy -
Bučí -
Čeminy -
Černíkovice -
Čerňovice -
Česká Bříza -
Chotíkov -
Chříč -
Dobříč -
Dolany -
Dolní Bělá -
Dolní Hradiště -
Dražeň -
Druztová -
Heřmanova Huť -
Hlince -
Hněvnice -
Holovousy -
Horní Bělá -
Horní Bříza -
Hromnice -
Hvozd -
Jarov -
Kaceřov -
Kaznějov -
Kbelany -
Kočín -
Kopidlo -
Koryta -
Kozojedy -
Kozolupy -
Kožlany -
Kralovice -
Krašovice -
Křelovice -
Krsy -
Kunějovice -
Ledce -
Líně -
Líšťany -
Líté -
Lochousice -
Loza -
Manětín -
Město Touškov -
Mladotice -
Mrtník -
Myslinka -
Nadryby -
Nečtiny -
Nekmíř -
Nevřeň -
Nýřany -
Obora -
Ostrov u Bezdružic -
Pastuchovice -
Pernarec -
Pláně -
Plasy -
Plešnice -
Pňovany -
Potvorov -
Přehýšov -
Příšov -
Rochlov -
Rybnice -
Sedlec -
Slatina -
Štichovice -
Studená -
Tatiná -
Tis u Blatna -
Tlučná -
Třemošná -
Trnová -
Úherce -
Újezd nade Mží -
Úlice -
Úněšov -
Úterý -
Vejprnice -
Velečín -
Vochov -
Všehrdy -
Všeruby -
Výrov -
Vysoká Libyně -
Zahrádka -
Zbůch -
Žihle -
Žilov -
Zruč-Senec

Geography

The terrain is undulating, most of the territory has the character of uplands. The territory extends into three geomorphological mesoregions: Plasy Uplands (most of the territory), Rakovník Uplands (north) and Teplá Highlands (small part in the northwest).

The Berounka forms the district border in the east. The longest river in the district is its tributary Střela. The souther part of the distrixt is crossed by the Mže. The territory is poor in bodies of water. The largest body of water is Hracholusky Reservoir, built on the Mže.

There are no large-scale protected areas.

Demographics

Most populated municipalities

Economy
The largest employers with its headquarters in Plzeň-North District and at least 500 employers are:

Transport
The D5 motorway (part of the European route E50) from Prague to Plzeň and the Czech-German border passes through the southern part of the district. Another important road in the district is the I/20 (part of European route E49) from Karlovy Vary to Písek via Plzeň.

Sights

The most important monuments in the district, protected as national cultural monuments, are:
Plasy Monastery
Manětín Castle
Mariánská Týnice pilgrimage site with the Church of the Annunciation

The best-preserved settlements and landscapes, protected as monument zones, are:

Manětín
Město Touškov
Rabštejn nad Střelou
Úterý
Dolany
Hlince
Jarov
Lhota
Lochousice
Nynice
Olešovice
Radějov
Studená
Plasko landscape

The most visited tourist destination is the Plasy Zoo.

References

External links

Plzeň-North District profile on the Czech Statistical Office's website

 
Districts of the Czech Republic